Armel is an unincorporated community in Frederick County, Virginia, United States. It lies east of Stephens City on Front Royal Pike (U.S. Highway 522). According to the Geographic Names Information System, Armel has also been known throughout its history as Bridgeport.

References

Unincorporated communities in Frederick County, Virginia
Unincorporated communities in Virginia